Rivas Dávila is one of the 23 municipalities of the state of Mérida, Venezuela. The municipality occupies an area of 187 km2 with a population of 20,128 inhabitants according to the 2011 census.

Parishes
The municipality consists of the following two parishes, with their capitals listed in parentheses:

Bailadores (Bailadores)
Gerónimo Maldonado (La Playa)

References

Municipalities of Mérida (state)